Galloping Thru is a 1931 American Western film directed by Lloyd Nosler and written by Wellyn Totman. The film stars Tom Tyler, Betty Mack, Alan Bridge, Si Jenks, Stanley Blystone and Gordon De Main. The film was released on December 5, 1931, by Monogram Pictures.

Cast          
Tom Tyler as Tom McGuire
Betty Mack as Janice Warren
Alan Bridge as Sandy Thompson 
Si Jenks as Doctor
Stanley Blystone as Wallis
Gordon De Main as Cliff Warren 
John Elliott as Mr. Winton
Artie Ortego as Stagecoach Driver

References

External links
 

1931 films
American Western (genre) films
1931 Western (genre) films
Monogram Pictures films
American black-and-white films
1930s English-language films
Films directed by Lloyd Nosler
1930s American films